History in the Making is the debut solo studio album by American rapper J.R. Writer. It was released on June 27, 2006 through Diplomats/Koch Records. Recording sessions took place at Legindary Studios, at Santana's World, at Romeo Studios, and at Sony Music Studios in New York. Production was handled by Doe Boyz, Knoxville, Antwan "Amadeus" Thompson, Dame Grease, Dutch Beetz, Flaco The Great, I.N.F.O., J.U.S.T.I.C.E. League, Nova, Pro-V, The Narcotics and Treblemakers, with Cam'ron serving as executive producer. It features guest appearances from 40 Cal., Cam'ron, Fred Money, Hell Rell, Jim Jones, Nicole Wray, Paul Wall and S.A.S.

The album debuted at number 25 on the Billboard 200 and number two on both the Top R&B/Hip-Hop Albums and Top Rap Albums (held from the top spot by Pimp C's Pimpalation), selling an estimated 29,261 copies in its first week of release.

Track listing

Charts

References

External links

E1 Music albums
2006 debut albums
J.R. Writer albums
Albums produced by DVLP
Diplomat Records albums
MNRK Music Group albums
Albums produced by Dame Grease
Albums produced by J.U.S.T.I.C.E. League